Poylu or Poyli may refer to:
Poylu, Agstafa, Azerbaijan
Poylu, Samukh, Azerbaijan
Poylu, Poylu, Azerbaijan